The 2006 Hawaii gubernatorial election was held on November 7, 2006. Incumbent Linda Lingle was the first Republican to be elected governor of Hawaii since 1959. Although 2006 was a strong election year for Democrats, Lingle won re-election by a landslide owing to an economic rebound in the state that occurred during her tenure after a shaky decade for the state economy during the 1990s and early 2000s. , this remains the last time that a Republican has been elected Governor of Hawaii or won any statewide office, as well as the only time in history that a Republican governor has been re-elected in the state. This, along with the 1972 United States presidential election in Hawaii, constitute the only time a Republican won the state with more than 60% of the vote.

Republican primary

Candidates 
 Linda Lingle, incumbent governor
 George L. Berish, fellow of the Society of Actuaries
 Paul Manner, freelance news correspondent
 George G. Peabody, editor of the Molokai Advertiser-News

Results

Democratic primary

Candidate 
 Randy Iwase, former state senator and former Honolulu city councilor
 William Aila, Wai'anae harbormaster
 Van Tanabe, former telecommunications executive

Results

Green Party 
 James Brewer Jr. - full-time political-economic educator and advocate for Hawaii's employee families

Libertarian Party 
 Ozell Daniel, comedian

General election

Predictions

Results

References

External links

External
Official Campaign Websites (Archived)
Linda Lingle
Randy Iwase
William Aila Jr.

Official government and party websites
 Office of the Governor
 Hawaii Democrats
 Hawaii Republicans
 Green Party of Hawaii
 Libertarian Party of Hawaii

Internal
 U.S. gubernatorial elections, 2006
 State of Hawaii
 Governors of Hawaii
 Democratic Party of Hawaii
 Hawaii Republican Party
 Green Party of Hawaii

Governor
2006
Hawaii